Under the Whyte notation for the classification of steam locomotives, a  wheel arrangement refers to a locomotive with two engine units mounted under a rigid locomotive frame, with the front engine unit pivoting and each engine unit with six coupled driving wheels without any leading or trailing wheels. The wheel arrangement was mostly used to describe Mallet locomotive types.

A similar wheel arrangement exists for Double Fairlie, Meyer, Kitson-Meyer and Garratt articulated locomotives, but on these types it is referred to as  since both engine units are pivoting.

Overview
The 0-6-6-0 wheel arrangement was used mostly on Mallet locomotives, on which the engine units were mounted either in tandem or facing each other.

Usage

Canada
The only compound Mallets to operate in Canada were the R1 class  Vaughan design locomotives, with the cylinder ends of the engine units facing each other. The class was owned by the Canadian Pacific Railway and served on the Big Hill in British Columbia, which had a 4.1% grade. Five locomotives were built between 1909 and 1911. A sixth one was built, but it was a simple expansion Mallet with two sets of high-pressure cylinders. All the locomotives in this class were later converted to  types and were used as shunting and transfer engines in Montreal.

Germany
The Saxon Class XV HTV was a class of goods train tank steam locomotive operated by the Royal Saxon State Railways, which had been conceived for hauling trains and acting as banking engines for routes in the Ore Mountains. The two CCh4v locomotives were built in 1916 at the Sächsischen Maschinenfabrik, formerly Hartmann. In 1925, the Deutsche Reichsbahn grouped them into their DRG Class 79.0. The locomotive was of unusual design with two fixed six-coupled engine units with a central double cylinder on each side, each with a high-pressure cylinder for the rear and a low-pressure cylinder for the front drive.

Philippines
There were at least two examples of the type in the Philippines. One is Pampanga Sugar Mill No. 8 built by Baldwin Locomotive Works in 1917. Originally built for the Murmansk–Arkhangelsk Railway, it was not delivered due to the Russian Revolution. It has been working for the company by 1959 though its status after that remains unknown, likely scrapped.

The other is Insular Lumber Company No. 7 Siete. Another Baldwin locomotive built in 1925. It remains the sole articulated locomotive to be preserved in the country as well as the largest to be preserved, now located in the plaza of Sagay, Negros Occidental.

United States
The first Mallet locomotive in North America was built in the United States and was of this type, the Baltimore and Ohio Railroad Class O no. 2400. Nicknamed Old Maude after a cartoon mule, it had a  tractive effort and was a great success despite a top speed of only .

The Kansas City Southern used the type as freight engines, with pilots, and had the most of them with twelve locomotives. The 0-6-6-0 wheel arrangement was also used to a limited extent on logging railroads and in mountain terminals.

The Western Maryland Railway had a small fleet of 2-6-6-2 locomotives which, at one time, were the heaviest locomotives in the world, weighing 264 Tons. They were all converted to 0-6-6-0 locomotives for heavy switching.

References